Veniamin Emmanuilovich Dymshits (February 15, 1910, Feodosia, Taurida Governorate – May 23, 1993, Moscow) was a Soviet state and party leader. Hero of Socialist Labor.

Member of the Central Committee of the Communist Party of the Soviet Union (1961–1986), Deputy of the Council of the Union of the Supreme Soviet of the Soviet Union of 6–11 Convocations from the Khabarovsk Krai.

Biography
Born on September 28, 1910, in Feodosia (now Crimea) in a tradesman's family. Grandson of the Jewish writer Abraham–Aba Rakovsky (1854–1921), the author of fiction and journalism in Hebrew.

 Since 1927, a worker in the Donbass;
 Since 1928, a worker at the enterprises of Moscow;
 1929–1931 – student of the Moscow Autogenous Welding Institute, later transformed into the Welding Department of the Moscow Higher Technical School Named After Nikolai Bauman;
 Since 1931, work manager, engineer, production manager, deputy work manager of the Kuznetskstroy Welding Office;
 Since 1932 – Director of the Ural Regional Welding Office;
 Since 1933, he was the Head of the Department of Engineering Structures for Construction at Azovstal in Mariupol;
 Since 1934, he studied in absentia at the Mechanical Faculty of the Donetsk Institute of Business Executives (did not graduate);
 Since 1937 – Director of a Metalwork Plant at the construction site of the Azovstal Metallurgical Plant, Head of Construction at the Krivoy Rog Metallurgical Plant;
 In 1939–1946, he was the manager of the Magnitostroy Trust. It was during the Great Patriotic War that Dymshits's high human dignity and his talent as a leader were clearly revealed: he had a difficult task – to lead the creation of an outpost of the domestic industry in the Urals. In record time, 42 complex objects were built under his leadership;
 In 1945, he graduated from the Moscow Higher Technical School Named After Nikolai Bauman as an external student;
 In 1946–1950 – manager of the Zaporozhstroy Trust;
 Since 1950 – Deputy Minister of Construction of Heavy Industry Enterprises of the Soviet Union;
 1954–1957 – Deputy Minister of Construction of Metallurgical and Chemical Industry Enterprises of the Soviet Union;
 1957–1959 – Chief Construction Engineer of the Bhilai Metallurgical Plant in India;
 From June 9, 1959, to April 25, 1962 – Head of the Capital Construction Department of the State Planning Committee of the Soviet Union – Minister of the Soviet Union;
 From April 25, 1962, to July 17, 1962 – First Deputy Chairman of the State Planning Committee of the Soviet Union – Minister of the Soviet Union;
 Since July 17, 1962, Deputy Chairman of the Council of Ministers of the Soviet Union, at the same time Chairman of the State Planning Committee of the Soviet Union (July – November 1962);
 Chairman of the Council of the National Economy of the Soviet Union (1962–1965);
 Chairman of the State Committee of the Council of Ministers of the Soviet Union for Material and Technical Supply (1965–1976).

On March 4, 1970, Veniamin Dymshits was the main figure at a press conference of Jewish citizens of the Soviet Union, where he defended Soviet policy towards Jews and the policy of the State of Israel.

Veniamin Dymshits made a significant contribution to the foundation of the industrialization of the Soviet Union, its transformation into a powerful state. Here are some of the construction projects in which he participated and which he headed: Azovstal, Kuznetsk, Krivoy Rog, Magnitogorsk, Zaporozhye, Bhilai (India) Metallurgical Plants, lead industry facilities and many others. All these construction sites bore the stamp of his brilliant engineering thought, initiative, tireless work, and complete dedication.

Since December 20, 1985, he has been a personal pensioner of union significance.

He died on May 23, 1993. He was buried in Moscow at the Novodevichy Cemetery (Plot No. 10).

Awards and prizes
 Hero of Socialist Labour;
 Seven Orders of Lenin;
 Two Orders of the Red Banner of Labour;
 Medals;
 Stalin Prize of the Second Degree (1946) – for the development of new methods of high–speed construction and installation of blast furnaces, carried out at the Chusovsky and Magnitogorsk Metallurgical Plants;
 Stalin Prize of the Third Degree (1950) – for the development and implementation of technological rules in housing and industrial construction.

References

Sources
 
 Veniamin Dymshits. Magnitka in a Soldier's Overcoat / Moscow: Architecture, 1995
 Veniamin Dymshits. Builder's Notes / Moscow: Architecture, 2001
 Boris Shmyrov. Dymshits Veniamin Emmanuilovich. Stages of a Long Journey – Chelyabinsk: ABRIS, 2015 – 112 Pages. (By Fate They Are Connected with the Urals). 
 Dymshits, Veniamin Emmanuilovich // Encyclopedia of Modern Ukraine: in 30 Volumes (Ukrainian) / National Academy of Sciences of Ukraine, Shevchenko Scientific Society, Institute of Encyclopedic Research of the National Academy of Sciences of Ukraine – Kiev, Since 2001 – Volume 7: Вод – Гн 
 Dimshits Veniamin Emmanuilovich // Encyclopedia of the History of Ukraine: in 10 Volumes (Ukrainian) / Editorial Board: Valery Smoliy (Chairman) and Others; Institute of History of Ukraine of the National Academy of Sciences of Ukraine – Kiev: Scientific Opinion, 2004 – Volume 2: G – D – 518 Pages: Illustrations –

External links
 

1910 births
1993 deaths
People from Feodosia
Burials at Novodevichy Cemetery
Soviet engineers
Heroes of Socialist Labour
Recipients of the Order of Lenin
Recipients of the Order of the Red Banner of Labour
Stalin Prize winners
People's commissars and ministers of the Soviet Union
Eleventh convocation members of the Soviet of the Union
Tenth convocation members of the Soviet of the Union
Ninth convocation members of the Soviet of the Union
Eighth convocation members of the Soviet of the Union
Seventh convocation members of the Soviet of the Union
Sixth convocation members of the Soviet of the Union
Central Committee of the Communist Party of the Soviet Union members
Bauman Moscow State Technical University alumni
Russian memoirists